Phlegmacium myrtilliphilum is a species of fungus in the family Cortinariaceae.

Taxonomy 
The species was described in 2014 and classified as Cortinarius myrtilliphilus. It was placed in the subgenus Phlegmacium of the large mushroom genus Cortinarius.

In 2022 the species was transferred from Cortinarius and reclassified as Phlegmacium myrtilliphilum based on genomic data.

Etymology 
The specific epithet myrtilliphilum (originally myrtilliphilus) alludes to the association with Vaccinium myrtillus plants.

Habitat and distribution 
Known only from Norway and Finland.

See also

List of Cortinarius species

References

External links

myrtilliphilus
Fungi described in 2014
Fungi of Europe